Julia Mary Langdon (born July 1946) is a British journalist and writer.

A political journalist since 1971, she became a lobby correspondent in 1974. Leaving The Guardian in 1984, she was appointed political editor of the Daily Mirror, the first woman to hold the position on a national newspaper in the UK. Later, Langdon was political editor of The Sunday Telegraph. Having children, however, was one of the reasons she left the parliamentary lobby in the 1990s.

Langdon has been a freelance writer since 1992, and has written a biography of the Labour politician Mo Mowlam (2000) and is writing a biography of former Prime Minister Gordon Brown. She has also worked as a broadcaster for the BBC. She presented a programme on BBC Radio 4 about the recruitment of female spies, which featured an interview with Eliza Manningham-Buller former head of The Security Service. In the programme Langdon revealed that she had been approached at school to work for the secret services.

References

1946 births
Living people
British journalists
The Guardian journalists